The Gräbersberg, at , the highest point in the western Westerwald, a low mountain range in central Germany whose western region extends from the Nister river in the east to the Rhine in the west. On the slopes of the Gräbersberg lies the village of Alpenrod, part of the collective municipality of  Hachenburg. South of the hill is the protected area of the Westerwald Lake District and village of Lochum.

Viewing tower 
In 1998, a 73-metre-high viewing tower, the Gräbersberg Tower, was erected at the summit by mobile telephone operator, E-Plus. At 33 metres above the ground there is a viewing platform which is 8.5 metres in diameter.

Panorama

References

External links 
 www.alpenrod.de

Mountains and hills of Rhineland-Palatinate
Mountains and hills of the Westerwald